Paul B. Preciado (born 11 September 1970 as Beatriz Preciado), is a writer, philosopher and curator whose work focuses on applied and theoretical topics relating to identity, gender, pornography, architecture and sexuality. Originally known as a female writer, in 2010 Preciado began a process of "slow transition" where he started taking testosterone to medically transition. From this point on he has publicly considered himself transgender as well as a feminist.

Career 
Preciado came to The New School in New York from Spain on a Fulbright scholarship to get an MA in Philosophy. Jacques Derrida and Agnes Heller became mentors to Preciado. Despite taking a short gap during the spring of Preciado's first year at The New School, Preciado maintained close relations with many professors. In fact, in 1999, Derrida, one of Preciado's professors, invited Preciado to teach a seminar in Paris on forgiveness and the gift during transformation. After transitioning into his professional career, Preciado and his newfound partner, Alberto Perez, began to hold empowerment forums in impoverished communities. Later, he came back to the United States to complete his PhD in Philosophy and Theory of Architecture at Princeton University, writing a dissertation called, Pornotopía: Architecture and Sexuality in Playboy During the Cold War in 2010, which in book form later won the Prix Sade in France.

Preciado has been professor of Political History of the Body, Gender Theory, and History of Performance at Université Paris VIII and was the director of the Independent Studies Program (PEI) of the Museum of Contemporary Art of Barcelona (MACBA). He was Curator of Public Programs of documenta 14, Kassel and Athens.

Since January 2013, Preciado has regularly contributed to French newspaper Libération′s website Liberation.fr, in a column having gender, sexuality, love and biopower as recurrent themes.

In 2023, he directed a documentary film Orlando, My Political Biography. The film was screened at the 73rd Berlin International Film Festival in festival's Encounter section on 18 February 2023, where it was awarded a Special Jury Prize. In its announcement the jury described the film as "revelatory, moving and spirited." The film received a special mention in the festival category Best Documentary Film, and also the Teddy Award as best documentary film.

Personal life 
Known originally as a female writer and identified as a lesbian, Preciado announced in 2014 that he was transitioning and, in January 2015, changed his first name to Paul. Preciado dated French writer-director Virginie Despentes from 2005 to 2014.

Testo Junkie (2008)

In 2008, the book Testo Junkie: Sex, Drugs, and Biopolitics in the Pharmacopornographic Era, relating Preciado's experience on self-administering testosterone, was published in Spain (as Testo yonqui) and in France. The work was later translated into English in 2013.

Preciado prefaces the book, stating "This book is not a memoir" but "a body-essay". Preciado takes a topical pharmaceutical, Testogel, as a homage to French writer Guillaume Dustan, a close gay friend who contracted HIV and died of an accidental overdose of a medication he was taking. Preciado investigates the politicization of the body by what he terms "pharmacopornographic capitalism".

Preciado described the act of taking testosterone as both political and performance, aiming to undo a notion of gender encoded in one's own body by a system of sexuality and contraception.

In the work, Preciado describes and analyses the changes provoked by the testosterone from the point of view of the relationship with Virginie Despentes (referred to as "VD" in the book). Testo Junkie also deals with the political aspect of other drugs that transform the body, such as birth control, Viagra, drugs used in doping, Prozac, and estrogen.

According to Preciado, all sexual bodies become "intelligible" according to a common "pharmacopornographic technology". There is no such thing as gender without technology. Technology is understood in large sense, from writing technologies, to bio-chemical and image production.

Can the Monster Speak?

On 17 November 2019, Preciado gave a speech before the École de la Cause Freudienne (School of the Freudian Cause)—a society of Lacanian psychoanalysts—in which he described his life as a trans man and challenged the precepts of psychoanalysis.  He only managed to read a quarter of his prepared speech before being booed off the stage.  The complete text of the speech was later published as a small book.

In the complete text of the speech, Preciado considered himself as an object of the audience's medical gaze, likening himself to Red Peter—a character in the Franz Kafka short story "A Report to an Academy" who begins life as an ape, learns human speech, and gives an account of himself at a scientific conference—and Frankenstein's monster.  Preciado claimed that the practice and concepts of psychoanalysis (and its pathologization of transgender people) are not based in scientific objectivity, but instead reflect the heteronormative worldview of the white men who founded and practice the discipline.  In the second half of the text, Preciado made three observations.  He claimed that the binary view of sex and gender (men and women) informing psychoanalysis is not an intrinsic property of reality, but is simply a current historical view which was preceded by earlier paradigms.  Preciado cited Hippocrates, Galen and Vesalius to claim the existence of a previous "one-sex" model of humanity in which men and women existed on a continuum, with each being simply the superior and the inferior instances of organisms in the same one species.  Second, Preciado noted that psychology and medicine invented vocabulary throughout the twentieth century (e.g. transexual, intersex) to describe exceptions to the notion of the gender binary, and also to pathologize them while preserving the disciplines' paradigmatic frameworks.  Third, Preciado predicted the increased problematization of gender throughout the twenty-first century, and therefore called on the society to revise its psychoanalytic premises.

Publications
 Pornotopia: an essay on Playboy's architecture and biopolitics. New York, Zone Books. 2014. .
 Testo Junkie: sex, drugs, and biopolitics in the pharmacopornographic era. The Feminist Press at the City University of New York. 2013.
 "The pharmaco-pornographic regime : sex, gender, and subjectivity in the age of punk capitalism" in Stryker, Susan, and Aren Z. Aizura. The Transgender Studies Reader 2. 2013. 
 Manifiesto contrasexual (Countersexual Manifesto). 2002. – Inspired by the thesis of Michel Foucault. An Apartment on Uranus. London, United Kingdom: Fitzcarraldo Editions; Los Angeles, CA: Semiotext(e). 2020.Tr. Charlotte Mandel.

Art and Curatorial
 La International Cuir. Museo Nacional Centro de Arte Reina Sofía, Madrid, Spain. (curator)
 PRO-CHOICE at Fri Art. Fribourg, Switzerland. Curated by Petunia, by invitation of Corinne Charpentier. (In show)
 La Pasión Según Carol Rama'' at the Museu d'Art Contemporani de Barcelona.

References

1970 births
Living people
21st-century Spanish philosophers
People from Barcelona
Philosophers of sexuality
Princeton University alumni
Queer theorists
Spanish queer theorists
Spanish philosophers
The New School alumni
Academic staff of the University of Paris
Transgender men
Transgender writers
Spanish transgender people
Spanish LGBT writers
Transgender academics
Transgender studies academics
Spanish feminists
Feminist writers
LGBT feminists
Male feminists
LGBT philosophers